Robert Moss (13 November 1884 – 21 May 1932) was a New Zealand cricketer. He played in one first-class match for Wellington in 1903/04.

See also
 List of Wellington representative cricketers

References

External links
 

1884 births
1932 deaths
New Zealand cricketers
Wellington cricketers
Cricketers from Wellington City